Heiko Bellmann (17 March 1950 – 7 March 2014) was a German biologist, writer, zoologist and photographer. He published over fifty books.

Bellmann died on 7 March 2014 at the age of 63.

References

Other websites
  

1950 births
2014 deaths
20th-century German biologists
Photographers from Baden-Württemberg
20th-century German zoologists
German male writers
People from Ulm
Scientists from Baden-Württemberg